Euplica turturina, common name : the turtle dove shell, is a species of sea snail, a marine gastropod mollusk in the family Columbellidae, the dove snails.

Description
The shell size varies between 9 mm and 16 mm

Distribution
This species has been found in the Indian Ocean along East Africa, North Transkei, Aldabra, Chagos, Madagascar, Mozambique and in the Indo-West Pacific.

References

 Dautzenberg, Ph. (1929). Mollusques testaces marins de Madagascar. Faune des Colonies Francaises, Tome III
 Spry, J.F. (1961). The sea shells of Dar es Salaam: Gastropods. Tanganyika Notes and Records 56

External links
 

Columbellidae
Gastropods described in 1822